Dogora: Ouvrons les yeux ("Dogora: Open our eyes") is a 2004 film directed by Patrice Leconte which has been compared in its conception with the likes of the Qatsi trilogy.

External links
 

French documentary films
2004 films
2000s French-language films
Films directed by Patrice Leconte
Non-narrative films
2000s French films